Lancaster House may refer to:

in England
Lancaster House, a mansion in the St. James's district in the West End of London
Lancaster House, an Edwardian warehouse on Whitworth Street in Manchester, England

in the United States
(by state)
John L. Lancaster House, Mountain View, Arkansas, listed on the NRHP in Stone County, Arkansas
John Lancaster House (Keene, Kentucky), listed on the NRHP in Jessamine County, Kentucky
Lancaster House (Stevensville, Montana), listed on the NRHP in Ravalli County, Montana
King–Lancaster–McCoy–Mitchell House, Bristol, Virginia, listed on the NRHP in Bristol, Virginia
Judge Columbia Lancaster House, Ridgefield, Washington, listed on the NRHP in Clark County, Washington

See also
Lancaster Block (disambiguation)